The 2014–15 Eintracht Frankfurt season was the 115th season in the club's football history. In 2014–15 the club played in the Bundesliga, the top tier of German football. It was the club’s third season back in the Bundesliga and the 46th overall.

Friendlies

Indoor soccer tournaments

Harder13 Cup

Frankfurt Cup

Competitions

Bundesliga

League table

Results summary

Results by round

Matches

DFB-Pokal

Squad

Squad and statistics

|}

Transfers

Transferred in

Transferred out

References

External links
 Official English Eintracht website 
 German archive site
 2014–15 Eintracht Frankfurt season at kicker.de 
 2014–15 Eintracht Frankfurt season at Fussballdaten.de 

 

Eintracht Frankfurt seasons
Eintracht Frankfurt